Bryotropha heckfordi is a moth of the family Gelechiidae. It is found in mountainous areas of central and northern Spain.

The wingspan is 14–15 mm. The forewings are pale cream coloured with a broad, black median streak. The hindwings are pale grey, slightly darkened towards the apex. Adults have been recorded on wing from July to August.

Etymology
The species is named in honour of Mr. R. J. Heckford for his work in increasing the knowledge of the immature stages of Bryotropha species.

References

Moths described in 2005
heckfordi
Moths of Europe